Caldcluvia is a monotypic genus in the family Cunoniaceae with the only species Caldcluvia paniculata, known as tiaca, an evergreen tree native to Chile. It is found from Ñuble to Aisén (36 to 45°S). Most species that were previously placed in the genus are now placed in  Ackama, Opocunonia and Spiraeopsis.

Description
Caldcluvia paniculata can grow up to 20 m (65 ft) in height and up to 60 cm (24 in) in diameter.   The bark is grayish brown. The leaves are oppositely arranged, toothed edge, oblong and lanceolate shaped. 7-15 long, 2–4 cm wide, with the apex and base acute. Glossy green above and whitish and somewhat hairy below, the petioles are fluted and hairy about 0-7-1 cm long. The white flowers clustered in axillary peduncles are hermaphrodite, peduncles and pedicels are hairy, 4-5 hairy sepals and more or less imbricate, 4 –5 petals alternate to the sepals. 8-10 stamens, 2 styles. The fruit is an acuminate capsule, hairy and crowned by persistent styles, inside them there are dark brown seeds about 1 mm long.

The tree requires wet climate, tolerates up to 40% shade, and may need partial shade in some locations. It is classified in USDA Hardiness Zone 9. Germination from seeds is less than 30%.

Taxonomy
Caldcluvia was named after Scottish botanist Alexander Caldcleugh, who travelled to South America between 1819–1825; he collected plants for Royal Botanic Gardens, Kew in England. , Plants of the World Online accepted only one species, Caldcluvia paniculata. The epithet paniculata, or panicled, means "with panicles".

Cultivation and uses
The leaves are used as herbal tea for the treatment of colds and stomach disorders. It has been planted in Northern Ireland.

References

External links

Cunoniaceae
Monotypic Oxalidales genera
Taxa named by Antonio José Cavanilles
Flora of the Valdivian temperate rainforest